Kosmos 1074 ( meaning Cosmos 1074) was a Soviet unmanned long-duration test flight of the Soyuz-T spacecraft launched on January 31, 1979 and de-orbited on April 1, 1979.

Mission parameters
Spacecraft: Soyuz 7K-ST
Mass: 6450 kg
Crew: None
Launched: January 31, 1979
Landed: April 1, 1979

References

Kosmos satellites
1979 in the Soviet Union
Spacecraft launched in 1979
Soyuz uncrewed test flights